Cuento de Luz is an independent publisher specializing in illustrated children books. Founded in 2007 by Ana Eulate in her garage, the company published its first title in April 2010.  Cuento de Luz publishes their books in both English and Spanish.

References

External links 
 Cuento de Luz official website

Publishing companies established in 2007
Book publishing companies of Spain
Mass media in Madrid
Spanish companies established in 2007